Gregorij Rožman (9 March 1883 – 16 November 1959) was a Slovenian Roman Catholic prelate. Between 1930 and 1959, he served as bishop of the Diocese of Ljubljana. He may be best-remembered for his controversial role during World War II. Rožman was an ardent anti-communist and opposed the Liberation Front of the Slovene People and the Partisan forces because they were led by the Communist party. He established relations with both the fascist and Nazi occupying powers, issued proclamations of support for the occupying authorities, and supported armed collaborationist forces organized by the fascist and Nazi occupiers. The Yugoslav Communist government convicted him in absentia in August 1946 of treason for collaborating with the Nazis against the Yugoslav resistance. In 2009, his conviction was annulled on procedural grounds.

During the Communist period, official historiography portrayed Rožman as a Nazi collaborator. Western historians, including Jozo Tomasevich and Gregor Kranjc have also, more recently, described Rožman as a collaborator, based on his proclamations and actions during the war. The Roman Catholic Church in Slovenia has been actively campaigning for his rehabilitation, claiming his actions were motivated solely to minimize the number of Slovenian casualties during the war.

Pre-war years

Early life
Rožman was born on 9 March 1883 into a Carinthian Slovene family in Dolintschitschach near Feistritz ob Bleiburg in Austria-Hungary to Franc Rožman and Terezija (née Glinik) Rožman. The family lived on a medium-sized farm, had seven children (Gregorij was the youngest) and was severely indebted. In 1889 he started attending public school in Šmihel and then enrolled in a gymnasium in Klagenfurt.

During his years in gymnasium he lived in the Marijinišče dormitory, which hosted students that were expected to study theology after graduating. He published essays in the newsletter of Carinthian Slovenes Mir and also (under the pseudonym "Emil Fanič") in the handwritten student journal Vaje, for which he edited six issues from 7th grade until graduation. After graduating with honors in 1904 he studied theology in Klagenfurt. He joined the Academy of Slovene seminaries becoming its president of it in his final year and published essays in its journal Bratoljub (which he edited in school year 1906/07). At that time, Slovene students were in constant conflict with German students, who published their own journal, Germania. The conflict was over nationalistic frictions in Carinthia. He was a member of the Congregation of Mary. In his last school year he visited Rome with the Rev Anton Benetko, where he met Pope Pius X.

Parish priest, prefect and docent

On 21 July 1907, he was ordained in his home parish of St Michael by Bishop Jožef Khan. In 1908, he was sent as a chaplain to Ferlach. At that time Ferlach was politically controlled by German liberals. The workers were tending towards social democracy. He set to renew the spiritual life in his parish and was active in propagating Christian-social ideas and organising the workers. He stayed in Ferlach for one year.

On 1 October 1909 he went to Vienna to continue his study of theology. On 27 June 1912 he obtained a PhD in theology from Catholic Theology Faculty of University of Vienna. After returning he was appointed as a prefect in boys' seminary Marianum in Klagenfurt in 1912 and as a docent of moral theology in 1913. In the school year 1914/15 he was appointed as a docent of Canon law and relieved of prefect service. In 1914 he taught moral theology to 4th grade at Klagenfurt and moral theology and canon law to the first three grades at Plešivec. He participated in Eucharistic Congress in Vienna in 1912 and as a result wrote a prayer book titled "Presveta Evharistija" (published in 1915 by Družba Sv. Mohorja). After the publication of a new Code of church law in 1917 he was appointed to a committee for its realization in Klagenfurt Diocese. He participated in the Slovene Christian-social association as a lecturer.

The Treaty of St. Germain divided the plebiscite area in Carinthia into zone A and B. Zone A was under Yugoslav administration and lost control of Klagenfurt. Carinthian bishop Adam Hefter established a special vicariate in Ebendorf in July 1919 and appointed Rožman as a judicial consultant of general vicar provost Matija Raindl. Because of his engagement with Carinthian Slovenes and his open support for Yugoslavia in the Carinthian Plebiscite it was quite clear that in case a majority in zone A decided against Yugoslavia in the plebiscite he would not be able to stay in Carinthia.

Canon law professor in Ljubljana

Soon after the integration of the Slovenes in Kingdom of Serbs, Croats and Slovenes, on 23 July 1919 Regent Alexander signed a law creating the University of Ljubljana and in December lectures commenced. Janez Zore, a church historian from the Theology faculty, proposed that Rožman be invited as a professor of church law. Rožman accepted, with permission from Bishop Hefter. Rožman began lecturing on 7 January 1920. He lived in Ljubljana with professor Alfonz Levičnik and took a position of prefect in the student's seminary Marijinišče in the school year 1920–21. After less than five months of teaching, on 31 May, he was nominated by his colleagues for a docent position and promoted by the ministry on 27 August. He was listed as an associate professor in the school year 1924–25.

He published many essays, both professional and pastoral, mostly in Bogoslovni Vestnik. As in his lectures, his essays explained the practical pastoral implications of a law for a common priest. He included current events in his essays. He wrote an important essay titled Church and politics (publication date unknown) which would become very relevant in the Second World War. In it he said that the Church "has the task to protect the truths of Christianity, that is moral and religious truths, to protect, teach and accustom the nations for them to organize all their lives and acts according to these truths". In his opinion many areas are not related to the Church, giving it no right to take sides or even decide on such issues. Instead, he claimed that the Church should limit itself to religious, moral or ecclesiastical issues. He also stated his opinion about coup d'état (or revolution) and any official government authority: he said that "the church is indifferent on different forms of authority, it considers none of them to be the only right one; it rejects none, as long as it is capable of reaching the purpose of the state". This purpose was to "protect justice for everybody and to care for public prosperity". 

The Church "condemns as immoral and violent change of government, every revolution". However, if the violent takeover has occurred "the Church teaches that the highest duty of every government is to take care of public prosperity. At the time of revolution, the highest duty of the government and the citizens is to end chaos as soon as possible and to build on the ruins of the old a new state, which will function as a device of public prosperity. If the revolutionary government is strong and able enough to positively organize the state to reach its goal, than this highest duty requires of every citizen to recognize the new government.". In these essays he stated that in time of war, the Church's duty is to "reduce the horror of the war" and care for war prisoners. 

Another important essay was Church and the state, which was used for a lecture at the fifth Catholic rally in Ljubljana on 28 August 1923. In it he explained his relation to government, writing, "the source of every authority, even political, is God. Every authority is given for the welfare of the humanity". He added that state sovereignty cannot be absolute, as it is dependent on God, which limits that authority, the limits "which it should not cross, if it does not want to abuse its power against the will of God, in which name it wields the sword (Romans 13,4)". He says that the common concern of both, the church and the state, is marriage, children and education. Disagreement between them in these areas causes great damage to the citizens and to the state itself. He criticized the Kingdom of Yugoslavia under the Vidovdan Constitution, which set limits on church autonomy, saying that the "annunciation of the religious truth is one of the main tasks of the Catholic Church and its inner affair", so "we must, on the basis of our catholic principles, reject every attempt to institute a police control over the church in its own matters".

Involvement in the Orel

Orel was a Slovenian Roman Catholic youth gymnastic and sport movement that was organized in the early 20th century as an alternative to a liberal gymnastic movement Sokol. The decision to create it was taken at a gathering of Slovene Christian-social association in Maribor, between 3 and 4 September 1905. The first club was established in Jesenice, in February 1906. Then on 10 April 1908, the Association of Gymnastic Sections was created. On 19 March 1909 at a local assembly of AGS in Bohinjska Bistrica, the organisation was officially named Orel. Rožman learned of the organisation in Carinthia, as by 1913, its section had five sub-sections. 

In 1920, in Ljubljana, he was elected by the Orel president board as secondary vice-president. As a priest, he quickly became its spiritual leader. As the organisation in Orel began to evolve, he took leadership of debate club, high-school students and other elements. After it was rebuilt in the newly established Kingdom of Serbs, Croats and Slovenes, Orel greatly expanded its membership, but neglected its spiritual and religious side. In 1921 Rožman wrote an article in the Theological Journal, Contributions for pastoral profession in which he expressed his ideas about pastoral activity of youth organisations (like Orel).

He first asked whether the organisation should attend equally to everyone or focus on the elite athletes. He proposed a compromise, saying that the Catholic Church is required to pastorally attend anyone that counts himself as its member, but that its missionary activity could be advanced by success in sports, especially among the youth. He emphasized the need for youth to be part of Christian organisations, because if the youngsters were left alone, they could easily fall under the influence of materialism and so become communists or social democrats. He highlighted the importance of spiritual growth, advising Orel members to join Mary's congregation (as they were more focused on spiritual life than Orel). In addition, he emphasized the importance for Orel of family values, national consciousness and other Christian values.

He left Orel in 1929, when he became suffragan bishop. The Yugoslav government banned Orel, leaving only the state-controlled Sokol shortly afterwards.

Bishop of Ljubljana

He was appointed as co-adjutor bishop of Ljublana on 17 March 1929 and consecrated titular Bishop of Semta on 14 July 1929. He succeeded as Bishop of Ljublana on 17 May 1930. As a bishop, he set out to spiritually renew his diocese, starting with his priests, who he felt should not be involved in politics. After leaving Orel, he focused on the Marian societies, but mainly on Catholic Action, in which he saw the strongest tool for the renewal of his diocese. In the argument between two Christian youth organisations — Youth of Christ the King (sl) (whose members were known as the Mladci or Youth), led by the high-school teacher Ernest Tomec (sl), and the Guard (sl) academic club (whose members were known as the Stražarji or Guards), led by theology professor Dr Lambert Ehrlich. Both groups claimed to represent Catholic Action — Rožman decided in favor of the Mladci.

Second World War

Background and wartime situation in Slovenia

In the interwar period Slovenia was part of Yugoslavia. The strongest political force in the province was the Slovenska Ljudska Stranka (SLS-Slovene People's Party), under the heavy influence of the Catholic Church. The Canadian historian Gregor Kranjc notes "In [SLS] propaganda the Catholic Church and national traditions were facing a colossal struggle against atheistic, international revolutionaries".

Fascism exerted a strong attraction. In 1933 the SLS-friendly Catholic daily "Slovenec" (The Slovenian) wrote: "Whatever is positive in Fascism is taken from Christianity, and in this course Fascism must absolutely be part of the anti-Bolshevik front". The strongly anti-semitic leader of the SLS, Anton Korošec, was responsible for anti-Semitic laws Yugoslavia enacted in 1940, restricting Jews in entering schools and universities (see Antisemitism in Europe). Right-wing, fascist-inspired Catholic student organizations, such as Straža were active. All these became part of the collaborationist forces soon after the occupation.

Following the invasion on 6 April 1941, the Axis powers divided the occupied territory between themselves. Nazi Germany annexed Lower Styria, but later dropped annexing Carinthia because of partisan activity. Italy annexed the so-called "Provincia di Lubiana" on 3 May 1941. Hungary realized their formal annexation on 16 December 1941. Although fascist Italy had brutally repressed Slovenes in the Littoral for two decades,   they initially promised some (never-delivered) autonomy for Slovenes in the annexed Ljubljana Province and left most of the old administration in place. Italian was introduced as an optional language in schools and universities and at first, there was little violence. They accepted 18,000 refugees expelled from the German zone. This can be to some degree attributed to the cooperation ("collaboration") of notable Slovenian public figures. Collaboration with the occupiers began almost immediately. Rožman, then SLS-head Marko Natlačen and other prominent Slovenes pledged loyalty to Fascist Italy in April and May 1941. Later as the resistance grew, Italian authorities interned some 40,000 Slovenes in concentration camps, where 7,000 reportedly died.

The Nazis chose a policy of violent Germanisation. They planned to expel 240,000 Slovenes, but due to partisan resistance expelled some 83,000 Slovenes to other parts of the Third Reich, as well as to Serbia and Croatia. More than 63,000 Slovenes were interned in Nazi concentration camps The Slovenian language was banned from public use, Slovenian cultural associations were dissolved, etc. The Nazis were hostile to the church: much of its property was confiscated, 448 priests were forced into exile, and the authorities rejected any intervention by the church. The Hungarian regime was similar to the German approach. Resistance was organized by the Liberation Front of the Slovene People, led by the Communist Party (CP), but including 18 other groups (Christian Socialists, the gymnastic group Sokol, etc.)

The CP saw the occupation as a chance to gain power. It was weak in numbers but experienced in underground activities, because it was banned in Yugoslavia. The Liberation Front at first developed in the Italian occupation zone. On 16 September 1941 it declared it was the only "authorized" resistance. Traitors were to be sentenced to death. In this way Slovenes, including Church representatives (most notably Lambert Ehrlich, assassinated after he wrote a letter to the Fascist authorities, asking that they arm Slovenes, to jointly fight against the Partisans), were "liquidated" by "Security-Intelligence Service", called VOS, a unit recruited solely from CP and communist youth organization SKOJ. The inhabitants of the Province of Ljubljana, especially peasants, suffered from both Italian attacks on their lives and property and from partisan attacks. Partisans stayed in a village for a few weeks, confiscating food and property in return for "freedom loan" certificates promising the return of property after liberation. When the Italians located the partisans, the partisans fled and the Army punished the villagers. After a short period the soldiers retreated to their base, the partisans would return and the cycle continue. According to the fascist Commissar Grazioli, the Partisans liberated two-thirds of the Ljubljana Province by mid-1942.

This caused the Italian fascist authorities to organize a brutal offensive against the Partisans in Summer 1942, with 80.000 well-armed Italian troops to combat some 2,500 to 3,000 poorly-armed Partisans. The Italians shot on the spot all Slovenes caught with arms or forged documents, relatives of Partisans and thousands of young Slovene men were rounded up and sent to concentration camps. With the aid of Slovene collaborationist forces, the fascist authorities also managed to kill some 1,000 Partisans.

In the fall of 1942, at Rožman's urging, the collaborationist forces (Slovene Legion, National Legion, Sokol Legion and Slovene Chetniks) gathered in the Legion of Death, became part of the MVAC forces, armed and led by the Italian military. Later these collaborationist forces joined the SS-commanded Home Guard, to fight with the Germans against the Partisans. Meanwhile, American and British Allies sent observers to the Partisans. In recognition of their success in fighting Axis forces, the Allies formally recognized the Partisans in 1943, supporting them with arms and materiel. Partisans also performed "revolutionary" or "red" violence – violence targeted against enemies. The enemies included people opposed to communism, especially Catholics, wealthier people, and ethnic German civilians. This violence was especially frequent and brutal in spring and early summer 1942 (which led to spontaneous creations of village guards against such violence)". Among the victims during the war were 46 diocesan priests and 6 priests belonging to different religious orders. By comparison, the occupiers killed 24 diocesan priests and 10 priests of different religious orders. 

On the other side, Slovene collaborationist forces, like the Black Hand organization, arrested, tortured, killed and turned over many Slovenes to the fascist and Nazi occupiers. One example is the noted Slovene author Boris Pahor who along with 600 other Slovenes was turned over to the Nazis by Slovene collaborationist forces, all of them sent to the Dachau concentration camps. Altogether more than 11.000 Slovenes were killed in Italian and German concentration camps. During the war, close to 70,000 Slovenes were killed by the fascist occupiers and their domestic collaborators, while some 4,000 Slovenes were killed on the collaborationist side during the war, and an additional 14,000 in reprisals after the war (the vast majority of the latter were soldiers in the collaborationist forces).

Relations with Italians

The bishop and Church dignitaries wanted the people to survive the war with as few victims as possible. Rožman was convinced that for such a small nation an armed struggle against the occupying forces was doomed to fail, because the sacrifices would be out of proportion to any possible gains.

After the Italians issued the Statute of Autonomy on 3 May 1941, they expected the bishop to write a declaration of loyalty. He addressed a so-called declaration of loyalty to High Commissioner Emilio Grazioli, but the High Commissioner was not satisfied with its wording. He forged another declaration and directed it to Mussolini. Grazioli's text was published in the press. The original version read:

Excellency! A decree has been published today, via which the Slovenian territory occupied by the Italian army has been incorporated into Italy. When I consider this, I thank your Excellency ... I express absolute loyalty and ask God to bless you and our aspirations for the welfare of our people.

Rožman actually emphasized free development in cultural and religious spheres and promised loyalty and sent blessings for the efforts of the authorities for the good of the people. The forgery was so effective that many publications still use it as a proof of Rožman's collaboration.

In his own diocesan newspaper, Ljubljanski škofijski list, Rožman wrote that he actually told the fascist Commissioner, Grazioli, the following: "We are grateful to God that He has inspired in the leader of Greater Italy the thoughts of generous justice and considerate wisdom with which His Majesty ... suggested the foundation of the Province of Ljubljana" (note: the Province of Ljubljana is what the fascist occupiers called the portion of Slovenia that Mussolini annexed directly to Italy). In his diocesan newspaper, Rožman referred to the Italian occupiers as powers "which God has established" with whom Church representatives will "be pleased to co-operate".

Rožman welcomed Mussolini's annexation of a portion of Slovenia to Italy, and indicated his willingness to cooperate with the fascist occupiers. Former politicians such as former Ban Marko Natlačen and the mayor of Ljubljana, Juro Adlešič were brought to address a declaration to Italian authorities. The Italians dictated its wording. Rožman celebrated Masses for the Italian troops, provided Italian-speaking confessionals and organized a Mass of thanksgiving for Mussolini on 22 May 1941 at St. Nicholas Cathedral, Ljubljana. Italian propaganda effort took full advantage of his willingness to oblige, leading to Rožman being criticized by priests from Primorska region.

Rožman condemned the occupiers twice. On 24 October 1941 he wrote a letter to the clergy in which he complained about the devastation of the part of his diocese occupied by the Germans: in it all Church property was confiscated, religious enrollees of both sexes were expelled from their convents and 193 members of secular clergy expelled from 148 parishes and that about 200.000 of his people were without spiritual care.

On 26 September 1942, Rožman handed Grazzioli a memorandum, in which he criticized Italian means and proposed facilitating measures in 20 points. Grazzioli was furious and told him that if Rožman were not a bishop, he would have had him arrested.  Rožman wanted to condemn Italians from the pulpit, but during his visit to Rome in May 1942 the Pope advised him not to do so because the Italians would detain him in Italy and he would be unable to help the people of Ljubljana.

12 September 1942 memo
In August 1942, the Italian generals Roatta and Robotti visited Rožman and told him they would burn the whole Province of Ljubljana and kill or deport all of its inhabitants if the attacks by Partisans did not stop. Rožman invited 21 representatives of the former political parties and of cultural institution to discuss the Italian threats (20 of whom came). They agreed only to organize help for the victims.

After the meeting a memorandum was written. Only the German translation was located, leaving unanswered questions about its authors and quality of translation (the memorandum is in many respects similar to one written in April 1942 by the Rev Lambert Ehrlich, Ljubljana University theologian and supervisor of a right-wing Slovene Catholic student youth group, asking the fascist authorities, to similarly arm Slovenes to fight the Partisans) The bishop's contribution is unknown other than that he delivered the memorandum to General Robotti, commander of the Italian 11th Army Corps. The memo read:

The document containing the German translation is in the Library of Congress in Washington, D.C. Also preserved are Robotti's notes in which he refers to Rožman as the author and adds, "[T]he security guards that the bishop suggests, correspond with local militias that have the task of defending their villages against communists, and to be available for actions in the local area – there are many such militias, which count a total of 1,000 men. These are doing their work decisively, not only from a military standpoint, but also as police, as the bishop says ...".

Memorandum Aftermath
The Italian fascist authorities followed through on many of the recommendations in Rožman's memorandum. Jozo Tomasevich indicated that the bishop's support led to the rapid growth of the Italian-led MVAC units, which absorbed "The Legion of Death" forces which had informally collaborated with the Italians in their brutal offensive against the Partisans in the Summer of 1942. The Italians also released Yugoslav Army officers. At the urging of the SLS and other Slovene collaborationist groups, in March 1942 the Italians apprehended and sent to POW camps 1,100 Yugoslav Army officers, since Slovene collaborationist groups saw them as a threat. Now at the urging of the same SLS and Rožman, the Italians released some of the officers, but only those willing to fight against the partisans.

Relations with Liberation Front
The main resistance group, the Liberation Front, which included groups such as the Social Christians, as well as priests, made multiple appeals to Rožman. The first of these was a letter the leadership of the Liberation Front sent to Rožman on 30 November 1941 They noted the increasing involvement of priests with right-wing groups which would form the core of Slovene collaborationist forces. At the same time the Liberation Front indicated its support for freedom of religion, and stated they would like to see more priests in their movement, or at the very least would like to see priests remain neutral. They also indicated that they would be willing to meet with Rožman and discuss all issues. Rožman never responded to the letter.

Three additional letters were addressed to Rožman in 1942, by Catholics in Liberation Front, beseeching him and other members of the Church not to support collaborationist forces, which were fighting on the side of the fascist occupiers, causing much Slovene bloodshed, and instead urged the church to remain neutral. Edvard Kocbek, leader of the Christian Socialists, wrote a fifth letter to Rožman in 1943, criticizing Rožman for not responding to the previous missives from the Liberation Front, and for continuing to allow priests to take part in the political and military work of collaborationist forces. As with previous letters, Rožman did not respond to Kocbek either

The Liberation Front included many believers in its ranks, and some 40 priests joined the partisans in Ljubljana Province alone.  Among them was the noted historian, and priest, Metod Mikuž, who at one time had served as secretary to Rožman. Mikuž and two other priest became members of the Plenum, the Liberation Front's highest governing body. For his activities among the partisans, Rožman suspended Mikuž from the Church in 1943.

Stance towards communism
For Rožman as well as for the most Church representatives, the fact that by communists dominated the "Liberation Front" (and performed murderous sanctions against the perceived traitors) presented a special dilemma. The Church detested the violation of human rights and repression, but also found Marxism and Bolshevism incompatible with Church doctrine. The ideological differences were the subject of the anti-communist encyclical Divini Redemptoris issued in 1937 by Pope Pius XI on which Rožman based his stance. The bishop rejected in 1938 as irrelevant for Slovenia the Pope's clarification to French Roman Catholics that the encyclical did not require absolute noncooperation with Communists.

The Communists began using violent methods to gain political power, which Church authorities could not accept. In 1943, after the siege and fall of Turjak and Battle of Grčarice, followed by mass liquidations at Jelendol, Mozelj and other places and the show trial in Kočevje he dedicated all four Advent sermons to the evils of Communist ideology, citing Russia and Spain.

Rožman said that it is his duty to speak the truth, otherwise he would have to justify himself in front of God. He preached "Do zadnjega bom trdil in učil, da je brezbožni komunizem največje zlo in največja nesreča za slovenski narod" ("") At the funeral of Marko Natlačen, who was executed by a member of VOS at home on 12 October 1942, Rožman stated that there could be

no co-operation, no association with godlessness or those to whom godlessness is a leading opinion. Stand firm in your belief in God, build your future on God's Commandments, which alone can be a firm basis of healthy development of any nation, big or small. Stay alive – my nation – don't kill yourself and don't provoke measures able to corrupt  your life force.

In his Pastoral letter about godless communism on 30 November 1943 he urged Catholics to "fight godless Communism" through prayers. Rožman wrote

I know that advocates of Communism and some other blind Catholics will reproach me that I am meddling in politics in a pastoral letter, which isn't a matter for a bishop and doesn't appertain to the Church. But, dear believers, the battle against communism isn't political, but a religious matter, as it touches upon belief in God, one of the most basic truths of every faith, especially our Christian faith. To reject atheistic doctrines, to defend the truths of our global religion is a religious matter and a religious duty, that admits everyone with common sense.

In his Christmas message to the Slovene Home Guard in 1944 Rožman talked about shepherds in Bethlehem keeping watch over their flock in the fields and asked the Home Guard to take an example by them.

You are defending your nation against wolves and jackals who destroy lives and property of their own fellow-countrymen, against 'tenants, who do not care about their sheep', who are poisoning souls with foreign mentality of godless communism and through that they break down the spiritual foundations, on which all the spiritual wealth that we have in common with Christian Europe, has been built for centuries.

Interventions for prisoners
Rožman intervened for detainees directly with the Italian authorities and via the Vatican. He reportedly attempted to protect deportees (to Serbia, Croatia and Germany), including clergymen, refugees, Serbs, Jews, prisoners of war, and others. He intervened 1318 times on behalf of at least 1210 individuals.

He intervened for various groups (for example 350 priests, deported to Croatia by Germans or 1700 children in the Italian concentration camps) covering more than 2495 people.  The bishop's secretary, Dr , testified that up to 50 petitioners came on a single day and that he helped them regardless of their political views. Among many documents a letter written by Gastone Gambarra, Commander of the Italian XI Army Corps, on 26 April 1943 documents that 122 internees were released because of his intervention. But the Italians noticed the bishop made no distinctions in his choices, so Grazioli ordered his subordinates to treat the bishop's interventions with no greater alacrity than those of anyone else, as the bishop had been purportedly intervening for the "unworthy".

Some of Rožman's interventions were made to gain officers for collaborationist forces. In his 12 September 1942 letter to the fascist general Robotti (quoted above), Rožman wrote that only "dependable" former Yugoslav officers, i.e. those willing to fight on the fascist side, should be released from Italian POW camps. The Italians followed Rozman's recommendations, releasing only "dependable" officers, while keeping all others in concentration camps. In the same letter Rožman proposed the fascist authorities create Slovene collaborationist units and Secret Police, to capture and turn over Slovenes to the occupiers, something both the Italians and Nazis implemented

In 1946 in Rome, Rožman himself told Bishop Joe B. Žabkar:  "All the contacts I have had with the Italians, I sincerely regret. All of them. I  have not achieved one thing, haven't rescued not one hostage,  prevented not one deportation, saved not even one house from arson fire, eased not one single suffering. Nothing, absolutely nothing. They always promised me everything, but never gave me anything."

Relations with Germans

After the capitulation of Italy (September 1943), Ljubljana was occupied by the Germans. On 14 September 1943, Nazi Gauleiter, Friedrich Rainer, met with Rožman to consult with him on setting up the new Nazi administration. Rainer had led the Germanization of the Slovene provinces of Styria, Carinthia and Upper Carniola, where he expelled 83,000 Slovene priests, teachers and others to Serbian and Nazi concentration camps, confiscated Slovene businesses and church property, and forbade the use of Slovene in schools and public institutions.

Rainer told Rožman that Upper Carniola, like Styria and Carinthia, would remain annexed to Nazi Germany, but promised Nazi support to Slovene collaborationists. Rožman gave Rainer a surprisingly detailed account of battles Slovene collaborationist forces were waging against the partisans, Rainer asked Rožman's opinion of Leon Rupnik (Slovene mayor of Ljubljana under the Fascists, and a notorious anti-Semite), whom he planned to appoint Nazi administrator of Ljubljana. Rožman concurred with the appointment, stating that he knew no one better qualified for the job

Rupnik was appointed as president of the Nazi provincial government on 22 September 1943. Rožman was photographed multiple times at formal and informal events chatting with SS General Erwin Rösener, the commander of German forces in the province, who ordered the execution of Slovene civilians, hostages and prisoners of war, actions which led to his name being on the indictment for war crimes at Nuremberg. From 1943 until the end of the war, Rožman was closely associated with the anti-Partisan, anti-communist Domobranci, the Slovenian Home Guard forces formed by order of SS General Rösener on 24 September 1943. 

Rožman support of the Nazis and his antisemitism is evident in a pastoral letter published on 30 November 1943, in which Rožman wrote "only by this courageous fighting and industrious work for God, for the people and the Fatherland will we, under the leadership of Germany, assure our existence and better future in the fight against the Jewish conspiracy."

Rožman held a silent mass prior to the Home Guard swearing a collective oath of allegiance to the German forces at Ljubljana's central stadium on 20 April 1944. According to some witnesses, he chose to observe events from the background despite the offer of place on the main stand, and left quickly afterwards. He declined to hold the mass at the second swearing in on 30 January 1945, but was present at the subsequent Home Guard parade in front of the Ursuline Church. This decision led to speculation about his motives. In his Christmas message to the Home Guard at the end of 1944, Rožman wrote: "You are defending your nation against wolves and jackals ... who are poisoning souls with the foreign mentality of atheistic communism".

Opposed to the western Allies' recognition of the Partisans and their support for the Tito-Šubašić Agreement, in March of 1945 Rožman and Leon Rupnik wrote a letter to the Ustashe leader, Ante Pavelić, proposing a political and military alliance to continue fighting the Partisans, and to try to gain recognition for the Slovene Home Guard, Ustashe and Chetniks from the Western allies.

Post-war
At the end of the war, he fled to the British zone of Austria.<ref>{{cite book|url=https://books.google.com/books?id=fqUSGevFe5MC&q=rozman+ljubljana+left+their+posts&pg=RA1-PA558|title=Google books, Jožo Tomašević, War and Revolution in Yugoslavia, 1941–1945|isbn=9780804779241|access-date=20 March 2013|last1=Tomasevich|first1=Jozo|date=October 2002}}</ref>

Rožman was tried for treason in absentia by the military court of the 4th Yugoslav Army. He was convicted and sentenced to 18 years imprisonment and forced labour, lifelong loss of citizenship and limitation of citizen rights on 30 August 1946. As Rožman had left Slovenia without the pope's permission, he was never assigned another formal position in the Church, and he was also denied ad limina access to the Pope.

After the war
Various leading Catholic figures from Yugoslavia were indicted for alleged war crimes, but escaped from justice, including Bishop Ivan Šarić of Vrhbosna in Sarajevo, who had supported the forcible conversion of non-Catholics to Catholicism. Rožman, Šarić and others had been living under British supervision at the bishop's palace at Klagenfurt, Austria, in October 1946.

Rožman began to appear in American and British intelligence reports as being involved in ratlines that spirited wanted Axis and collaborationist fugitives out of Europe. To get an American visa, Rožman did not visit the consulate in Bern; he communicated with the United States Consulate General at Zürich on 25 May for the purpose of obtaining a visitor's visa to the United States. On 28 May, he appeared at the Consulate General where he was informed of U.S. regulations regarding the issue of a non-quota immigration visa as a minister of religion. Rožman and Šarić were not together in Switzerland. Rožman was residing at the Institut Menzingen, near Zug, and Šarić was residing at Haute Rive near Friborg.

In Bern, Rožman's Ustashi friends were engaged in wholesale fraud, using the black market to convert the gold into dollars, and later, into Austrian schillings. 'Aid to the refugees is accounted for at the official rate of exchange for dollars', the American officers noted, adding that 'malpractices have been carried on (officially, the dollar is worth 10 schillings; on the black market, 100 to 150). According to reliable information: 'Rožman is going to Bern to take care of these finances. The money is in a Swiss bank, and he plans to have most of it sent through to Italy and from there to the Ustaše in [the] Argentine.'

A short time later Rožman duly arrived in Bern, accompanied by Bishop Ivan Šarić, the 'hangman' of Sarajevo. By the end of May 1948, Rožman had apparently carried out this money laundering operation for the Ustashi, for he visited the U.S. Consulate in Zürich and was given a 'non-quota immigration visa as a minister of religion'. He then traveled to the United States and settled in Cleveland, Ohio. The circle was now almost complete. Pavelić's stolen 'treasure' had been tracked down through close monitoring of the movements and activities of the quisling Bishop of Ljubljana. ...

After settling permanently in Cleveland, Ohio, Rožman is recorded as having visited Argentina on three occasions, in 1949, 1952 and 1956. He died in Cleveland on 16 November 1959, aged 76. Rožman was buried in the Franciscan cemetery in Lemont, Illinois. His remains were returned to Ljubljana and reinterred in the Ljubljana Cathedral on 13 April 2013."Ob sprejemu posmrtnih ostankov škofa Rožmana verniki napolnili stolnico", dnevnik.si, 13 April 2013. 

Rehabilitation and lawsuits
After Slovene independence in the 1990s, a request was made by the Catholic Church, to reevaluate Rožman's conviction. An official request for the reevaluation was made by Slovenian Public Prosecutor Anton Drobnič prior to the visit to Slovenia by Pope John Paul II in 1999. Anton Drobnič ordered two historians, Tamara Griesser Pečar and France M. Dolinar, to prepare a thesis or defence for this retrial. This was later published in Rožmanov proces. On the basis that he should have had the right to defend himself, Rožman's 1946 conviction was overturned by the Slovenian Supreme Court in 2007 and his case sent to the court of first instance for retrial. On 10 April 2009, the trial was terminated in light of the defendant's death.

See also
 Collaboration during World War II
 Leon Rupnik
 Aloysius Stepinac
 Ivan Šarić (archbishop)
 Yugoslavia during the Second World War
 Slovenian Home Guard
 Persecution of Christians in the Eastern Bloc
 Anti-Catholicism

References

Bibliography

 Pignataro, Luca, La Slovenia tra primo Novecento e secondo dopoguerra'', in "Nuova Storia Contemporanea", XIII, 1 (2009), pp. 11–30

Notes

Footnotes

External links

1883 births
1959 deaths
People from Völkermarkt District
People from the Duchy of Carinthia
Carinthian Slovenes
Roman Catholic bishops of Ljubljana
Slovenian collaborators with Nazi Germany
Slovenian anti-communists
Slovenian people of World War II
Yugoslavia in World War II
Trials in Slovenia
Antisemitism in Yugoslavia
Roman Catholic bishops in Yugoslavia
University of Vienna alumni
Academic staff of the University of Ljubljana
Yugoslav emigrants to the United States
People convicted in absentia
People convicted of treason against Yugoslavia
Antisemitism in Slovenia